Baron Peter Pavlovich Shafirov (1670–1739) was a Russian statesman and a prominent coadjutor of Peter the Great.

Early life and career
Shafirov was born into a Polish Jewish family. His father, Pavel Shafirov, was a translator in the Russian Foreign Office, whose parents converted to the Russian Orthodox Church after Smolensk was ceded to Russia by Poland in 1654.

Peter Shafirov first made himself useful by his extraordinary knowledge of foreign languages. He was the chief translator in the Russian Foreign Office for many years, subsequently accompanying Tsar Peter on his travels. He was raised to the Russian nobility as a baron and received the rank of vice-chancellor. He was considered a diplomat of the highest order.

Diplomatic missions
Shafirov concluded the Peace of the Pruth during the campaign of 1711. Peter left him in the hands of the Turks as a hostage, and on the breaking of the peace he was imprisoned in the Seven Towers. Finally, however, with the aid of the British and Dutch ambassadors, he defeated the diplomacy of Charles XII of Sweden and his agents, and confirmed the good relations between Russia and Turkey by the treaty of Adrianople (June 1713).

In 1718, Shafirov was appointed vice-president of the department of Foreign Affairs, and a senator.

Sentencing and end of life

In 1723, however, he was deprived of all his offices and sentenced to death. The capital sentence was commuted at the last minute to banishment, first to Siberia and then to Novgorod. Embezzlement and disorderly conduct in the senate were the offences charged against Shafirov. On the death of Peter, Shafirov was released from prison and commissioned to write the biography of his late master. However, the successful rivalry of his supplanter, Andrei Osterman, prevented Shafirov from holding any high office during the last fourteen years of his life.

Works
In 1717, he authored a treatise entitled A discourse concerning the just causes of the war between Sweden and Russia, a historical tract on the war with Charles XII. Shafirov detailed some of the greatest exploits of the tsar-regenerator.

References

Further reading
 Cracraft, James. "Diplomatic and Bureaucratic Revolutions". in The Revolution of Peter the Great (Harvard University Press, 2003)
 Butler, W. E. "Shafirov: Diplomatist of Petrine Russia."  History Today (Oct 1973), Vol. 23 Issue 10, pp  699–704 online.

1670 births
1739 deaths
17th-century Russian businesspeople
18th-century businesspeople from the Russian Empire
Barons of the Russian Empire
Diplomats of the Russian Empire
Jews from the Russian Empire
Foreign ministers of the Russian Empire
Russian nobility
Russian people of Polish-Jewish descent
Recipients of the Order of the White Eagle (Poland)
Senators of the Russian Empire